Rudolf Breuss (June 6, 1899 - May 17, 1990) was an Austrian naturopath and alternative cancer treatment advocate.

Biography

Breuss maintained that cancer lives on solid foods taken into the body, and that cancerous growths will die if a patient drinks only vegetable juices and herbal teas for 42 days. Breuss stated that more than 45,000 people were cured following his treatment. He wrote a book titled The Breuss Cancer Cure: Advice for the Prevention and Natural Treatment of Cancer, Leukemia and Other Seemingly Incurable Diseases; according to a 1995 English translation, Cancer Cure has been translated into seven languages and has sold more than 1 million copies.

A senior nurse for Cancer Research UK stated that they did not support alternative therapies that were not backed by scientific evidence, and that following a restricted diet such as Breuss's could cause malnutrition.

Reviews

A 2012 review of cancer diets named the Breuss diet as one of the most frequently mentioned, but cautioned there is no evidence to support taking these "cancer diets" and that they can be harmful.

A 2014 review of cancer diets listed the Breuss diet as having no benefit and the underlying hypothesis is not compatible with scientific concepts of cancer.

Selected publications

See also
List of ineffective cancer treatments

References

1899 births
1990 deaths
Alternative cancer treatment advocates
Alternative detoxification promoters
Fasting advocates
Naturopaths
Pseudoscientific diet advocates